Public School 11, also known as Highbridge School, is a historic school located in The Bronx, New York City. It is a part of the New York City Department of Education (NYCDOE).

Located in the Highbridge neighborhood, it is a brick and stone building in the Romanesque Revival style.  It has three sections: a three-story northern section with tower and rear extension built in 1889; a six bay, three story wing built in 1905; and a gymnasium / auditorium built in 1930.  The oldest section features a mansard roof. The interior of the auditorium has a mural added in 1937 as part of a Works Progress Administration arts project.

It was listed on the National Register of Historic Places in 1983. It was designated a New York City Landmark in 1981.

References

External links
 P.S. 011 Highbridge
 P.S. 011 Highbridge (profile) - New York City Department of Education

School buildings on the National Register of Historic Places in New York City
Romanesque Revival architecture in New York City
School buildings completed in 1889
National Register of Historic Places in the Bronx
Public elementary schools in the Bronx
Highbridge, Bronx